List of hospitals in Georgia may refer to:

List of hospitals in Georgia (country)
List of hospitals in Georgia (U.S. state)